Mark Irby "MRT" Fox (born March 1, 1956) is a retired United States Navy vice admiral who served as the Deputy Commander of United States Central Command (CENTCOM). Prior to assuming his duties at CENTCOM, he served as Deputy Chief of Naval Operations for Operations, Plans, and Strategy (N3/N5), Commander, United States Naval Forces Central Command and Commander, United States Fifth Fleet. He also previously served as the Commander of the Naval Strike and Air Warfare Center at Naval Air Station Fallon, Nevada, and as Communications Division Chief, American Embassy Annex, Baghdad, Iraq.

In October 2006, then-Rear Admiral Fox completed a tour as the Deputy Assistant to the President and Director of the White House Military Office (WHMO), responsible for overseeing all military support to the President of the United States. He also served as WHMO Deputy Director for 18 months before assuming responsibilities as WHMO Director in January 2005.

Naval career
A native of Abilene, Texas, Fox was commissioned in June 1978 upon graduation from the United States Naval Academy and was designated a naval aviator in March 1980.

During his career, Fox deployed from both coasts in five fleet tours, flying the A-7E Corsair II and F/A-18 Hornet in over 100 combat and contingency missions off the coasts of Lebanon and Libya, and over the Balkans and Iraq.

Fox's combat highlights include scoring the first navy MiG kill of Operation Desert Storm prior to dropping his bombs on an airfield in western Iraq on January 17, 1991, and leading the opening "Shock and Awe" strike of Operation Iraqi Freedom on March 21, 2003.

Fox's previous command assignments include Commander, Naval Strike and Air Warfare Center; Commander, Carrier Strike Group Ten; Commander, Carrier Air Wing 2; Commander, Strike Fighter Wing, United States Pacific Fleet; the first Commanding Officer of Strike Fighter Squadron 122 (the Navy's first F/A-18E/F Super Hornet Fleet Replacement Squadron), and Commanding Officer of Strike Fighter Squadron 81.

Shore tours include duty as an A-7E Instructor Pilot in Attack Squadron 174; a tour as the Light Attack/Strike Fighter Junior Officer Detailer in the Naval Military Personnel Command; assignment as Aide and Flag Lieutenant for Commander, Naval Air Force, United States Atlantic Fleet; Aide and Flag Lieutenant to the Assistant Chief of Naval Operations (Air Warfare – OP-05); joint duty as the Maritime Plans Officer at Supreme Headquarters Allied Powers Europe in Casteau, Belgium; and service as the Joint Strike and Aviation Programs Liaison Officer in the Navy's Office of Legislative Affairs in Washington, D.C.

Corporate career
Fox retired from the navy in April 2016, and in June 2016 joined Huntington Ingalls Industries as Newport News Shipbuilding Vice President of Customer Affairs.

Fox is married to Priscilla (née Wood). They have four children, William, Collin, Mason and Abigail.

Awards and decorations
Fox has logged over 4,900 flight hours and 1,348 arrested landings on 15 different aircraft carriers.

References

External links

Official Navy biography   This work is in the public domain.

|-

|-

1956 births
Living people
People from Abilene, Texas
United States Navy personnel of the Gulf War
Recipients of the Silver Star
Recipients of the Legion of Merit
Recipients of the Distinguished Flying Cross (United States)
Recipients of the Air Medal
Recipients of the Defense Distinguished Service Medal
Recipients of the Navy Distinguished Service Medal
United States Navy vice admirals
United States Naval Academy alumni
United States Naval Aviators
Military personnel from Texas